John Kristian Dahl (born March 27, 1981) is a Norwegian cross-country skier who competed between 2001 and 2019. His best World Cup finish was second, three times between 2003 and 2008, all in the sprint event.

On 2 March 2014, he won the annual long distance cross-country ski race Vasaloppet in Mora, Sweden as the fourth ever Norwegian skier to win. On 6 March 2016, he won it the second time with the time of 4:08:00 and on 5 March 2017, for the third time with the time 3:57:18.

On 10 April 2016, he also won the men's edition of Nordenskiöldsloppet.

On 2 April 2019, he announced his retirement from cross-country skiing.

Cross-country skiing results
All results are sourced from the International Ski Federation (FIS).

World Championships

World Cup

Season standings

Individual podiums

 2 victories – (1 , 1 ) 
 11 podiums – (9 , 2 )

Team podiums

 4 podiums – (1 , 3 )

References

External links
FIS-Ski profile

1981 births
Living people
Norwegian male cross-country skiers
People from Sør-Varanger
Sportspeople from Troms og Finnmark